The IEEE Biomedical Engineering Award is a Technical Field Award of the IEEE given annually for outstanding contributions to the field of biomedical engineering. It was established in 2010.

The award is sponsored by the IEEE Engineering in Medicine and Biology Society, the IEEE Circuits and Systems Society, and the IEEE Computational Intelligence Society. Recipients of this award receive a bronze medal, certificate and a cash honorarium.

Recipients 
Source

2013, Robert Plonsey, "For developing quantitative methods to characterize the electromagnetic fields
in excitable tissue, leading to a better understanding of the electrophysiology of nerve, muscle, and brain."  Plonsey retired from Duke University in 1996 as Professor Emeritus of Biomedical Engineering.

2014, Lihong Wang, "For pioneering photoacoustic tomography." Wang is Distinguished Professor of Biomedical Engineering at Washington University in St. Louis, USA.

2015, Christofer Toumazou,"For outstanding contributions to biomedical
circuit technology." He is Regius Professor of Engineering at Imperial College London and has developed numerous medical devices that have revolutionised healthcare.

2016, K. Kirk Shung, "For contributions to ultrasound imaging and transducer technology". Shung is Dean's Professor in Biomedical Engineering at University of Southern California.

2017, Bin He, "For contributions to neuroengineering and neuroimaging". Bin He is Distinguished Professor of Biomedical Engineering at University of Minnesota.

2018, Mark S. Humayun, "For contributions to the bioelectronic retinal implant." Humayun is Professor of Biomedical Engineering at University of Southern California.

2019, Matthew O’Donnell, "For leadership in biomedical ultrasonics and medical imaging technologies." O'Donnell is Professor of Bioengineering at University of Washington.

2020, F. Stuart Foster, " For contributions to the field of high-resolution imaging." Foster is Senior Scientist and Professor at the Sunnybrook Research Institute of University of Toronto.

2021, Katherine Whittaker Ferrara, "For the integration of ultrasound and engineered vesicles in the diagnosis and treatment of cancer.”" Ferrara is Distinguished Professor of Biomedical Engineering, University of California, Davis, California, USA

2022, Rory A. Cooper, “For extensive contributions to wheelchair technology that have expanded mobility and reduced secondary injuries for millions of people with disabilities.” FISA/PVA Distinguished Professor, University of Pittsburgh

References 

Biomedical Engineering Award